This is a list of electoral results for the electoral district of Peak Downs in Queensland state elections.

Members for Peak Downs

Elections in the 1970s

References

Queensland state electoral results by district